Keilani Johanna Ricketts Tumanuvao (born September 1, 1991) is an American, former collegiate All-American, pro All-Star left-handed hitting softball pitcher. She attended Archbishop Mitty High School in San Jose, and attended the University of Oklahoma from 2010-2013, where she was the starting pitcher and helped to lead the Sooners to the 2013 NCAA Division I national softball title. As a member of the United States women's national softball team she won 2011 World Cup of Softball. Ricketts currently plays for the USSSA Pride in the National Pro Fastpitch. She is the Sooners career leader in wins and strikeouts. She also ranks for career records in both the Big 12 Conference and the NCAA Division I, where she is one three players to win 100 games with 1,000 strikeouts and hit 50 home runs.

Oklahoma Sooners
Ricketts debuted on February 10, 2010 tossing three scoreless innings to beat the Florida Atlantic Owls. She was named Second-Team National Fastpitch Coaches' Association All-American along with First-Team All-Big 12 honors. As a freshman, she would break the record for strikeout ratio and then rank second for strikeouts overall at the school. Ricketts would lead the team into a Super Regional with the Washington Huskies and opened the series by beating National Player of The Year Danielle Lawrie before dropping the next two to be eliminated that year.

In her sophomore year, Ricketts would be named a First-Team All-American and earned her second conference honors. Ricketts would break her own and set the school record for strikeout ratio with a career best 11.1 per 7-innings. She also broke the school strikeouts record, which now ranks second all-time.

On April 16, 2011, Ricketts lost a 9-inning contest vs. the Missouri Tigers and combined with Tiger pitcher Chelsea Thomas to record 33 strikeouts, an NCAA top-10 record. In the NCAA tournament, the Sooners opened up that year against the Iona Gaels and Ricketts set a career and school high with 19 strikeouts in regulation, winning 7-1 on May 20. The Sooners made the Women's College World Series that year by defeating the Arizona Wildcats but did not win a game.

As a junior, Ricketts again earned First-Team honors from both the NFCA and the conference, this time being named 2012 Big 12 Conference Player of the Year while also achieving a pitching Triple Crown. She was also chosen USA Softball Collegiate Player of the Year and recognized with the Honda Sports Award for softball. She would break her own strikeout record with a career and school best total, while her career high in wins ranks second all-time for the Sooners; Ricketts also had her best ERA and WHIP. Ricketts would also lead the team in batting average and doubles with career highs, which she also tallied in home runs , RBIs, hits, triples and slugging percentage.

Ricketts fired a perfect game over the Kansas Jayhawks on March 30 and struck out 10 batters to cross the 1,000 career benchmark, becoming one of the elite to reach that milestone in three seasons. On May 19, Ricketts hit a grand slam to help reach a career high with 6 RBIs vs. the Lehigh Mountain Hawks. At that year's WCWS on June 1, for her second game Ricketts pitched a 16-strikeout, 2 hit shutout over the No.1 California Golden Bears. The Sooners would go on to defeat the defending champs to meet the Alabama Crimson Tide in the championship final. Ricketts won game one but then lost back-to-back games to drop the series. Ricketts would be named All-Tournament for her performance, tying the third best record for WCWS strikeouts with 64.

For a final season, Ricketts claimed her fourth First Team all-conference and third First-Team and fourth overall All-American honors, simultaneously winning Big 12 Pitcher of the Year. She would also earn her second USA Softball Collegiate Player of the Year and Honda Sports Award for softball to accompany the Honda Cup Award. Ricketts had a career best in shutouts and winning percentage with a near perfect season while also throwing 6 no-hitters, a top-5 NCAA record for a single season.

February 9, 2013 she won her 100th game, no-hitting the Oregon Ducks. Beginning on March 27-June 3, she had a career best 21 game win streak. Ricketts led her team to a No. 1 seed and culminated in winning the National Championship by besting the Tennessee Lady Vols in a 12-inning game one and then driving in all the runs, three of them the winning runs coming via her 50th career home run off Ivy Renfroe, in game two to seal the title. This would give her the Most Outstanding Player Award and her second All-Tournament recognition.

Ricketts would also become one of the most prolific and winning pitchers in WCWS history going 8-4 with 112 strikeouts and allowing 19 earned runs in 80.1 inning for a 1.00 WHIP in three trips. For her career she holds the school records in wins, strikeouts, shutouts, innings pitched and strikeout ratio. In the Big 12 she ranks second in career wins, strikeouts and shutouts, third in strikeout ratio, fourth in innings and 7th in ERA; offensively she stands third in walks, fifth in home runs and 10th in slugging percentage. In all of the NCAA she is 7th in wins all-time.

Personal life
Ricketts is of Samoan descent. She has three siblings that include Richard, a former Air Force Falcons football player, Stephanie, a former All-American Hawaii Rainbow Wahine softball player, and Samantha, a former All-American Oklahoma Sooners softball player and current Head Softball Coach for Mississippi State University. In December 2017, Ricketts married Sean Tumanuvao in San Jose, California.

Awards and honors
 2012—Winner of the Honda Sports Award for softball
 2012—Winner of the USA Softball Collegiate Player of the Year
 2013—Winner of the Honda Sports Award for softball
 2013—Winner of the USA Softball Collegiate Player of the Year 
 2013—Premier Player of College Softball as voted by the fans
 2013—The Honda-Broderick Cup winner for all sports.
 2017 National Pro Fastpitch All-Star

Statistics

See also
 NCAA Division I softball career strikeouts list
 NCAA Division I softball career wins list

References

External links
 
 USA Softball

1991 births
Living people
American people of Samoan descent
Oklahoma Sooners softball players
USSSA Pride players
Pan American Games gold medalists for the United States
Pan American Games medalists in softball
Softball players at the 2011 Pan American Games
Softball players from California
Sportspeople from San Jose, California
Medalists at the 2011 Pan American Games
Softball players at the 2019 Pan American Games
Medalists at the 2019 Pan American Games
Women's College World Series Most Outstanding Player Award winners